VF-66, known as the Firebirds, was a fighter squadron of the United States Navy established during  World War II.

Operational history
VF-66 was established on 1 January 1945 equipped with the FR-1 Fireball. The squadron was slated for the Pacific, however never saw combat and was disestablished on 18 October 1945.

See also
 List of inactive United States Navy aircraft squadrons

References

External links
Lineage for Fighter Squadrons

Strike fighter squadrons of the United States Navy